Arungundram (also spelled Arunkundram)  is a village in Tamil Nadu between Arcot and Kannamangalam. The village is surrounded by hillocks and paddy fields, and is about 8 km from Arcot in Vellore district.

Villages in Vellore district